The 1950 Utah Redskins football team was an American football team that represented the University of Utah as a member of the Skyline Conference during the 1950 college football season. In their first season under head coach Jack Curtice, the Redskins compiled an overall record of 3–4–3 with a mark of 1–2–2 against conference opponents, winning placing fourth in the Skyline. Utah played home games on campus at Ute Stadium in Salt Lake City.

Schedule

After the season

NFL Draft
Utah had one player selected in the 1951 NFL Draft.

References

Utah
Utah Utes football seasons
Utah Redskins football